Wolfram may refer to:

 Wolfram (name)
 Wolfram, an alternative name for the chemical element tungsten
 Wolfram Research, a software company known for the symbolic computation program Mathematica
 Wolfram Language, the programming language used by Mathematica
 Wolfram code, a naming system for one-dimensional cellular automaton rules introduced by Stephen Wolfram
 Wolfram syndrome, a genetic disorder
 Wolfram, Queensland, a former mining town in Australia
 The Wolfram, a fictional military airship in the air combat video game The Sky Crawlers: Innocent Aces

See also